Sandor Stern (born July 13, 1936) is a Canadian writer, director and film producer best known for his horror films.

Personal life

Born in the northern Canadian town of Timmins, Ontario; raised in the small town of Prescott, Ontario, on the St. Lawrence River; Sandor Stern was drawn to short story writing while in high school and began writing stage plays while attending the University of Toronto. Though he planned to obtain a degree in teaching, a physician-uncle suggested that medicine might offer more involving experiences for an aspiring writer. Heeding that advice, Stern enrolled in Medical School at the University of Toronto. During his schooling, he continued to write, switching to TV scripts, and selling his first script to the Canadian Broadcasting Corporation prior to his graduation in 1961. Three of his four sons formed the successful Los Angeles hardcore punk band Youth Brigade, and its almost 30-year-old record label Better Youth Organization.

Career
Setting up a private practice in Toronto, Stern continued to write; adding songwriting and variety sketch writing to his credits. Over the next five years, he wrote numerous shows for the CBC until demand for his work allowed him to give up the practice of medicine and devote full time to writing. He wrote the CTV network's first drama Rumble of Silence (1968) and created the CBC network's medical series Corwin (1969). Deciding to try his luck in Hollywood, Stern arrived in LA and immediately landed an assignment to write an episode of NBC's The Bold Ones. He quickly moved on to other episodic dramas such as Ironside (1969) and onto producing with The Mod Squad (1971) and Doc Elliot (1973). His TV movie producing began in 1974 with The Strange and Deadly Occurrence. In 1979, The Seeding of Sarah Burns was his first directing assignment. He created the short-lived 1983 CBS TV series Cutter to Houston. Since then he has written and/or directed more than 35 movies, including the screenplays for three feature films: The Amityville Horror (1979), Fast Break (1979) (winner of the 1979 NAACP Image Award for best screenplay) and Pin (which he also directed). Stern is married to Kandy Stern, an artist, production designer and producer with whom he co-wrote and co-produced the NBC movie Deception: A Mother's Secret (1991) and co-produced the USA Network cable movie Jericho Fever (1993). His recent credits include co-writing the Lifetime cable movie You Belong To Me (2007) and his first novel, The Life and Adventures of Ralph, The Cat was published in 2008. His short story, "My Grandfather Clock" was published in the anthology, "Canadian Voices" in 2009. His anthology of short stories, "The Karma Chronicles" was published in 2010. His recent writings are under the title Dear Republican Friends for suicidegirlsblog.com.

References

External links
 

Canadian television writers
Writers from Timmins
Jewish Canadian writers
Living people
1936 births
University of Toronto alumni
Canadian people of Jewish descent